Captive white tigers are of little known lineage. They are held captive around the world, usually for financial purposes.

Mohan and the Rewa strain

Mohan was the founding father of the white tigers of Rewa. He was captured as a cub in 1951 by Maharaja of Rewa, whose hunting party in Bandhavgarh found a tigress with four 9-month-old cubs, one of which was white. All of them were shot except for the white cub. After shooting a white tiger in 1948 the Maharaja of Rewa had resolved to capture one, as his father had done in 1915, at his next opportunity. Water was used to lure the thirsty cub into a cage, after he returned to a kill made by his mother. The white cub mauled a man during the capture process and was clubbed on the head and knocked unconscious. He was not necessarily expected to wake up, and this was his second brush with death. He recovered though, and was housed in the unused palace at Govindgarh in the erstwhile harem courtyard. The Maharaja named him Mohan, which roughly translates as "Enchanter", one of the many names of the Hindu deity Krishna.The name of the Maharaja was Raja Martand Singh.

The white tiger the previous Maharaja had kept in captivity from 1915 to 1920 was also a male, unusually large like most white tigers (Mohan was no exception in this regard), and had a white male sibling still living in the wild. After the captive white tiger's death in 1920 he was mounted and presented to the Emperor King George V, as a token of loyalty.  This specimen is now in the British Museum. The first live white tiger reached England in 1820, and was exhibited at London's Exeter Change menagerie where it was examined by the famous French anatomist Georges Cuvier, who described it in his "Animal Kingdom" as having faint stripes only visible from certain angles of refraction. In 1960 there was a mounted white tiger, with faint reddish brown stripes, in the throne room of the Maharaja of Rewa.

In 1953, Mohan was bred to a normal-coloured wild tigress called Begum ("royal consort"), which produced two male orange cubs on September 7, one of which went to Bombay Zoo.  In 1955 they had a litter of two males and two females on April 10 (which included a male named Sampson and a female named Radha), all normal-coloured. On July 10, 1956 they again had a litter of two males and two females, which included a male named Sultan who went to Ahmedabad Zoo, and a female named Vindhya who went to the Delhi Zoo and was later bred to an unrelated male named Suraj.  Once again, the breeding experiments failed to yield a single white cub.

Mohan was then bred to his daughter Radha (who carried the white gene inherited from her father) with success. The initial litter of four cubs—a male named Raja, and three females named Rani, Mohini, and Sukeshi—were the first white tigers born in captivity, on October 30, 1958. Raja and Rani went to the New Delhi Zoo, and Mohini was bought by the German-American billionaire John Kluge for $10,000, for the National Zoo in Washington, D.C., as a gift to the children of America, in 1960.

The Government of India made a deal with the Maharaja, under the terms of which Raja and Rani would go to the New Delhi Zoo for free. In exchange the Maharaja's white tiger breeding would be subsidized and he would receive a share of their cubs. He wanted Rs 100,000 for them. Technically Sukeshi was also the property of the New Delhi Zoo, and in a sense India had nationalized the captive white tigers of Rewa. The Parliament of India would hear reports on the progress of the white tigers, and Prime Minister Indira Gandhi and U Nu of Burma participated in public christening ceremonies for white cubs at New Delhi Zoo. Sukeshi remained at Govindgarh Palace, in the harem courtyard where she was born, as a mate for Mohan.

That same year, India imposed a ban on the export of white tigers,  in an effort to preserve a monopoly (as a tourist attraction), possibly because Anglo-Indian naturalist Edward Pritchard Gee recommended that Govindgarh Palace, and its white tiger inhabitants, be made a "national trust", which did not happen. Mohini was only allowed to leave India because US President Dwight D. Eisenhower intervened personally with Prime Minister Jawaharlal Nehru, to ask for the release of the United States government's white tiger. A white sister of Mohini's had been brought to New Delhi the year before to show the President, who was no stranger to white tigers. After the export ban was imposed the Maharaja threatened to release all of his white tigers into the Rewa forest, and so he was given dispensation to sell two more pairs abroad, to offset his costs.

Six zoos acquired white tigers from the Maharaja of Rewa including the Bristol Zoo in England (a brother and sister pair named Champak and Chameli on June 22, 1963, for the equivalent of $10,000 each) and the Crandon Park Zoo (which closed around 1983, and moved out of Crandon Park to the site of the Miami MetroZoo) in Miami acquired a white tigress in 1968. Bristol Zoo's pair, born in 1962, came from another litter of four, all white, but two (one female and one male) did not survive. Years later the Bristol Zoo needed a new breeding male and traded a white female to New Delhi Zoo for a white tiger named Roop, who had been named by U Nu, the Prime Minister of Burma. He was the son of Raja by his own mother and half sister- Radha, born in New Delhi. Radha, and many other tigers from Govindgarh including Sukeshi, were later transferred to New Delhi. Begum went to live at Ahmedabad Zoo and was bred to her son Sultan. They produced twelve cubs in four litters between 1958 and 1961. Bristol Zoo later transferred two male white tigers to Dudley Zoo.

The government of West Bengal bought two white males, named Niladari and Himadri, from the Maharaja for the Alipore Zoological Gardens (Calcutta Zoo), and an orange female named Malini, from the same litter of three born in 1960, accompanied them there. The Alipore Zoo in Kolkata, recovered the purchase price of its white tigers within six months by charging extra to see them. By 1966 the Bombay Zoo had a white tigress named Lakshmi, born in 1964, from the Maharaja. The Calcutta Zoo sold a white tigress named Sefali to Gauhati Zoo and sent a second white tiger there on loan. Circus owner Clyde Beatty also bought a white tiger from the Maharaja in 1960, for $10,000 in a deal facilitated by the Smithsonian National Zoo director T.H. Reed, who had traveled to India to escort Mohini to Washington, which had to be canceled because of the export ban, which made Mohini even more valuable. She was estimated to be worth $28,000. President Tito of Yugoslavia visited New Delhi Zoo and asked for white tigers for Belgrade Zoo, but was refused.  A white tiger named Dalip from New Delhi Zoo represented India in two international expositions in Budapest and Osaka. A white tigress named Nandni, who was born in New Delhi Zoo in 1971, went to Hyderabad Zoo. By 1976 the Lucknow Zoo also had a white tiger which was a gift from New Delhi Zoo. Zoos with white tigers constituted a most exclusive club and the white tigers themselves represented a single extended family. In 1965 or 1966 Terence Walton, a member of the Maharaja of Rewa's staff, was attending a performance of the Ringling Bros. Circus in Madison Square Garden and had a note passed to tiger trainer Charles Baumann, on the Maharaja's stationary, requesting an opportunity to discuss white tigers. He may have hoped to make a sale. Baumann was invited to Rewa, but was not able to go.

Mohan was featured in the National Geographic documentary "Great Zoos Of The World" in 1970.
He died later that year, aged almost 20, and was laid to rest with Hindu rites as the palace staff observed official mourning. He was the last recorded white tiger born in the wild. The last white tiger seen in the wild was shot in 1958 in the Hazaribagh forests of Bihar. There have been rumors of white tigers in Hazaribagh, the Tora forsts of Rewa, and Kanha National Park since 1958, but these were not considered credible by K.S. Sankhala. A photograph of Mohan's stuffed head, in a display case in the private museum of the Maharaja of Rewa in Govindgarh Lake Palace, appears in the National Geographic book "The Year Of The Tiger." Another picture of Mohan's head appears on the official website of the Maharaja of Rewa (MP).

The Maharaja of Rewa turned Mohan's native forest into the Bandhavgarh National Park, because he could not control the poaching. The Maharaja was negotiating the sale of a white male, named Virat, as late as 1976, when he died of enteritis. Virat was a son of Mohan and Sukeshi.

At Bandhavgarh visitors can stay at the White Tiger Lodge, which is the local version of Tiger Tops in Royal Chitwan in Nepal. Pushpraj Singh, the reigning Maharaja of Rewa, has asked students to sign a petition to ask the President of India to return at least two white tigers to Govindgarh Lake Palace, as a tourist attraction.

Mohini Rewa (Enchantress) and Sampson
Mohini, a daughter of Mohan, was officially presented to President Eisenhower by John W. Kluge, in a ceremony at the White House on December 5, 1960, and went to live at the Lion House, in the National Zoo, in Rock Creek Park. A reporter for The New York Times described the meeting of Mohini and President Eisenhower: "The President shied noticeably when the beast roared and leaped in his direction inside the traveling cage drawn up on the White House south driveway. An eloquent "Well!" was the President's only comment for the next few seconds." T.H. Reed, the director of the National Zoo, gave this description of Mohini: "Her stripes were black, shading into brown, but her main coat was eggshell white instead of the normal rufous orange. Exotic coloring and magnificent physique made her a tiger without peer. For a two-year-old kitten she had tremendous growth-almost 190 pounds, three feet tall at the shoulders, and eight feet from nose to tail." White tigers are larger and heavier than regular orange tigers. The average length of a white tiger at birth is 53 cm, compared to 50 cm for a normal orange cub. Shoulder height is 17 cm (normal 12 cm), weight 1.37 kg (normal 1.25 kg). Dalip and Krishna, two white tigers at New Delhi Zoo, weighed 139 kg and 120 kg respectively, at two years of age. Ram and Jim, two normal colored tigers at the same zoo, weighed 106 kg and 119 kg, at the same age. Raja, the white tiger, had a shoulder height of 100 cm, at ten years of age, while Suraj, an orange tiger, had a shoulder height of only 90 cm, at 12 years of age, according to New Delhi Zoo director K.S. Sankhala. Ratna and Vindhya, orange tigresses "from the white race", who carried the white gene as a recessive (both were fathered by Mohan), were higher at the shoulder than average, measuring 87 and 88 cm, compared to a normal orange tigress named Asharfi, who measured 82 cm at the shoulder. White tigers also grow faster than orange tigers. This would have given them an advantage in the wild.

Following Mohini's arrival in New York City from India, with National Zoo director T.H. Reed, she spent one night in the Bronx Zoo. A reception was scheduled at the Explorer's Club, and Mohini was to appear on the children's television show "Wonderama", with big game hunter Ralph S. Scott, who had been instrumental in bringing her to America. Mohini was also scheduled to appear on television in Philadelphia and Washington, D.C. On December 7, 1960, a television special was aired titled "White Tiger", which was a film about Mohini's trip from India. (The birth of Mohini's first litter in 1964 was televised in a national special.) Mohini was exhibited for three days in the Philadelphia Zoo, before traveling on to Washington. Her name is the feminine of Mohan, and translates as "Enchantress". She was her father's namesake. She was a great attraction, and the zoo wanted to breed more white tigers. At the time, no more white tigers were being allowed out of India, so Mohini was mated to Sampson, her uncle and half brother, who was sent from Ahmedabad Zoo in 1963. (It seems probable that financial considerations may have also precluded Washington from acquiring a second white tiger as a mate for Mohini.) Sampson was donated to the National Zoo by Ralph S. Scott. Mohini was originally betrothed to an orange Bengal tiger named "Mighty Mo", who was captured in Central India in the forests of the Maharaja of Panna by Ralph S. Scott, and donated to the National Zoo on June 19, 1959. Today there is a Panna National Park. Unfortunately Mohini used to push Mighty Mo around. The original plan was to breed Mohini with an unrelated orange tiger, and then breed her to one or more of her male offspring, in the hope of producing white cubs. That was before Sampson arrived. Sampson fathered the first two of Mohini's four litters, which were born in 1964 and 1966. Mighty Mo and another tiger named "Foa" were given to the Pittsburgh Zoo in August 1966.

After Sampson's death in 1966, at age 11 of kidney failure, Mohini was bred to her son Ramana, who was then the only male white gene carrier available. This resulted in the birth of a white daughter named Rewati on April 13, 1969, and a white son named Moni on February 8, 1970. Moni died of a neurological disorder in 1971 at 16 months. Moni was to have undertaken a fund raising tour for Project Tiger. He was born in a litter of five, which included two white males and three orange females. One was stillborn and the mother crushed the others after three days. When Moni was a cub he was photographed with Mrs. Suharto, the wife of Indonesian President Suharto, when she visited the National Zoo. Rewati had an orange male littermate which died after two days. Ramana was born on July 1, 1964, and had two litter mates: a white male named Rajkumar, who was the first white tiger born in a zoo, and an orange female named Ramani. Both died of feline distemper despite having been vaccinated, at ten months of age. Rajkumar had a particularly nasty disposition. All of Mohini's cubs were named by the Indian Ambassador. At the time of his death, at only ten months of age, Rajkumar already weighed 175 pounds, and could hardly be called a cub. He was first named "Charlie" by one of his keepers, before the Indian Ambassador gave him his official name. The National Zoo planned to trade Rajkumar for a number of other animals. He was equal to ten zebras in value. The Smithsonian Institution stepped in and vetoed the plan, insisting that Rajkumar would remain a permanent resident of Washington, D.C. Rajkumar was the only white tiger fathered by Sampson.

The birth of Mohini's first litter was televised in a national special. Mohini's orange daughter Kesari was born in 1966 with an orange female who was stillborn. It was even suggested, although probably not too seriously, that Indian Prime Minister Indira Gandhi be asked to bring a white tiger cub for the zoo, when she was scheduled to visit Washington in 1966. After Moni died in 1971 the National Zoo tried to acquire an orange tiger named Ram from Trivandrum Zoo, in southern India, as a mate for Mohini. Ram was her first cousin, a grandson of Mohan, and there was a 50% chance that he carried white genes. 25% of Ram's genes came from Mohan and 25% from Begum. 25% of Mohini's genes were from Begum and 75% from Mohan. Ram was a son of Vindhya and Suraj born on 23 IV 1965 at New Delhi Zoo, the same Ram discussed earlier. Two sisters of Ram, born on February 22, 1967, went to the Romanshorn Zoo in Switzerland. In 1973 an Indochinese tiger (Panthera tigris corbetti) named Poona, who was born at the Woodland Park Zoo in Seattle in 1962, was sent to Washington on a six-month breeding loan from the Brookfield Zoo and bred to Mohini and Kesari. (Poona would have been regarded as a Bengal tiger for the first two years of his life because the Indo-Chinese subspecies was not recognized until 1968.) Mohini did not conceive. Kesari produced six orange cubs, an extraordinary number, especially for a first litter, but only one survived, a female named Marvina. Kesari handed Marvina over to her keepers and kept the other five. Marvina was mistaken for male, and named Marvin which was changed to Marvina when it was discovered that he was a she. Washington Zoo keeper Art Cooper, who hand reared Marvina, observed that white tigers were the most obstinate cats in the zoo, and said that Marvina had a typical white tiger personality. (Poona also fathered litters by two other tigresses in Brookfield.) In 1974 Marvina, Ramana, and Kesari were sent to the Cincinnati Zoo and Botanical Garden, and Rewati and Mohini went to the Brookfield Zoo, to be boarded during renovations in Washington, until 1976.
As a fringe benefit of inbreeding the four cubs were pure-Bengal tigers, and they were the last registered Bengal tigers born in the United States. Ranjit, Bharat, Priya, Peela, and Rewati had inbreeding coefficients of 0.406. Ramana died in 1974 of a kidney infection and became a father for the last time posthumously.

A white half sister of Mohini's, bred from Mohan and Sukishi, born on March 26, 1966, named Gomti and later renamed Princess, lived in the Crandon Park Zoo in Miami for almost three years, before she died of a viral infection at age five in December 1970. She arrived in Miami on January 13, 1968.
Miami mayor Chuck Hall met the 22-month-old 350 lbs. white tigress at the airport and rode with her to the zoo. He wanted to call her Maya, the name suggested by the Maharaja, which translates as Princess. Ralph S. Scott, who paid $35,000 for her and gave her to the Zoological Society of Florida, preferred the name Princess. The Zoological Society of Florida loaned Princess to the Crandon Park Zoo. It was Ralph S. Scott, a famous big game hunter, who suggested to John W. Kluge that he buy a white tiger for the children of America. He had seen the white tigers in Govindgarh Palace while tiger hunting in India. The government of India wanted Princess to be the last white tiger exported from the country. A male white tiger, named Ravi, acquired by Ralph S. Scott for the Crandon Park Zoo died at Kanpur railway station en route from India in 1967. He was a son of Raja and Rani born in New Delhi Zoo, and sold by the Maharaja of Rewa. In 1970 Jimmy Stewart was on The Tonight Show Starring Johnny Carson and said that his wife was going to buy a white tiger from the Maharaja of Rewa for the Los Angeles Zoo. Ralph S. Scott was watching and felt as though he was being robbed. He had been trying to get a mate for Princess for years. A bidding war erupted between Scott, Jimmy Stewart, a major league baseball team, a Hollywood producer, and a major European zoo. Scott said of Princess "It is cruel to expect an animal like that to live alone. And you can't mate her with an ordinary tiger-she's so superior...I appealed to the Maharaja from a conservation standpoint and it hit home." Princess and Rajah were to be a "royal couple." The Los Angeles Zoo had already spent $20,000 building a white tiger exhibit. Scott said that he would try and send them a pair of cubs from Princess and Rajah, but Princess died a week before Rajah was scheduled to arrive. Scott hired an Indian taxidermist to stuff Princess, and she was presented to the Museum of Science in Miami in 1972, but she is now in the reception area of the Miami MetroZoo's administration building. Scott paid around $45,000 for Raja, who he thought might still be mated to Mohini, but Rajah never arrived in Crandon Park. Scott was so respected as a tiger hunter that he was asked to deal with man eaters which were terrorizing villages. He was a hunter turned conservationist, and a cat-lover.  Mohini died in 1979. The skins and skulls of Mohini and Moni are in the Smithsonian, but are not on display.

An orange brother of Mohini's named Ramesh lived in the Ménagerie du Jardin des Plantes (Paris Zoo), and was bred to an unrelated tigress, but none of the offspring survived to reproduce. Ramesh was born in Govindgarh Palace and had an orange female littermate, named Ratna who went to New Delhi Zoo, and a white male littermate named Ramu. They were the fourth and last litter of Mohan and Radha. Ratna was paired with a wild caught male named Jim, at New Delhi Zoo, and produced three litters. Each cub would have had a 50% chance of inheriting the white gene from Ratna. Jim was captured in the Rewa forest, so they thought there was a chance he carried white genes. He had been somebody's pet, but after he ate a cat he was given to New Delhi Zoo. Jim used to appear leaping into his pond, at New Delhi Zoo, in the opening of one of Gerald Durrell's TV shows. Edward Pritchard Gee mentioned, in his book "The Wildlife Of India" (which has a foreword by Jawaharlal Nehru), that Bristol Zoo wanted to acquire one of the cubs of Mohan and Begum, as a mate for one of its white tigers, Champak or Chameli, to lessen the degree of inbreeding, as the US National Zoo had done with Sampson. The Bristol Zoo did acquire one of the daughters of Mohan and Begum. In 1987 Ranjit, Bharat, Priya, and Peela were sold to the International Animal Exchange. Ranjit, Priya, and Peela went to the IAE's facility in Grand Prairie, Texas. The phenomenon of spontaneous ovulation in a tiger was first observed by Devra Kleiman, in one of the white tigresses at the National Zoo, which meant that it was possible to breed tigers by artificial insemination.
Mohini died in 1979 at 20 years of age. Edwards Park wrote in Smithsonian magazine that National Zoo director Ted Reed was "mourning his queen the late Mohini Rewa." Ted Reed said "It's impossible to say how much the zoo owes that cat and her cubs. They drew attention to the facility and made all of our recent improvements so much easier. If she had been human she would have been a movie star."

Tony, Bagheera, and Frosty: A new strain
Tony, born in July 1972 in the Circus Winter Quarters of the Cole Bros. Circus (the Terrell Jacobs farm) in Peru, Indiana, was the founder of many American white tiger lines, especially those used in circuses. His grandfather was a registered Siberian tiger, named Kubla, who was born at the Como Park, Zoo, and Conservatory in Saint Paul, Minnesota. Kubla's parents were born in the wild and believed to be brother and sister. Kubla was bred to a Bengal tigress named Susie, from a west coast zoo, at the Great Plains Zoo in Sioux Falls, South Dakota. She was once co-owned by Clyde Beatty. Between April 10, 1966, and August 3, 1969 Kubla and Susie produced 13 or 14 cubs in 5 or 6 litters. The cubs were widely distributed. One eventually reached Paris, and another went from the Utica Zoo in New York State to Japan. Two of their cubs (Rajah and Sheba II) were bred by Baron Julius Von Uhl, who lived in Peru, Indiana. Julius Von Uhl was born in Budapest and came to America in 1956 from Hungary after the revolution. One of the results of his tiger breeding was Tony, who therefore carried mixed blood He may have been the source of a gene for stripelessness. Kubla was also bred to an Amur tigress named Katrina, who was born at the Rotterdam Zoo, and passed through the hands of two American zoos before joining Kubla and Susie at the Great Plains Zoo. Kubla and Katrina have living pure-Amur descendants which may include a line of white tigers, that are claimed as pure-Amurs, which originated out of Center Hill, Florida. These white tigers are not registered Amur tigers. A tiger trainer named Alan Gold owned a pair of Amur tigers which once produced a stillborn white cub.

In 1972, there were four white tigers in the United States: Mohini and her daughter Rewati in Washington, D.C., Tony, and his first cousin  named Bagheera, a female born on July 8, 1972 in a litter of two white cubs, including a male which did not survive, in the Hawthorn Circus of John F. Cuneo Jr. Bagheera's mother, Sheba III, was a sister of Tony's mother, Sheba II. Bagheera's father was either an Amur tiger, named Ural, who was her preferred mate, and may have been her uncle and a littermate, or younger sibling, of Kubla, born at the Como Zoo; or one of two of her brothers, named Prince and Saber, who were also brothers to Tony's parents.

Most of Sheba III's litters did not include white cubs, but at least 50% of her orange cubs would have been white gene carriers, since they could have inherited the gene from their mother, and if both parents were heterozygotes 66%, or two out of three, of their orange cubs are likely to have been carriers. She had 27 cubs in 9 litters between July 8, 1972, and July 26, 1975, of which only 3 were white, or 11%, not 25% as would be expected if both parents in each mating were heterozygotes.  Prince was castrated before Sheba III conceived another white cub, a male named Frosty, born on February 25, 1975, in a litter which included two orange females and one orange male. It seems odd that a tiger which may have been fathering such valuable cubs (Prince) would have been neutered. Saber was never observed trying to mate, so perhaps Ural did sire one or more of Sheba III's white cubs, which would have been three quarters Siberian had this been the case. It is possible for tigers from the same litter to have different fathers. It's also possible that any or all three tigers-Ural, Prince, and Saber, carried the white gene. Ural was a sad specimen. He was cross eyed, although he was not white. Bagheera and Frosty were both severely cross eyed.

Tony was purchased by John F. Cuneo Jr., owner of the Hawthorn Circus Corp. of Grayslake, Illinois,  in February 1975 for $20,000 in Detroit. Tony's parents, Raja and Sheba, produced two more white cubs at the Baltimore County Fair on June 27, 1976. The cubs were a white male, named "Baltimore County Fair", a white female named "Snowball", and an orange male. National Zoo spokeswoman Sybille Hamlem said: "This could be a real bonus for the breed if the two stay in the United States. The white tigers are no longer found in the wild and there have been genetic problems because of inbreeding. But that's apparently not the case here." Snowball's name was later changed to "Maharani", and all three cubs were sold to the Ringling Bros. Barnum & Bailey Circus in Washington, D.C. Maharani died in 1984. Baron Julius Von Uhl had another three white cubs born between June 18 and 19, 1977 at Kingdom's 3 (formerly Lion Country Safari) at Stockbridge, Georgia off I-75 south of Atlanta. Two lived only a short time. The other, named Scarlett O'Hara, died at the Grady Memorial Hospital's animal research clinic in Atlanta, on January 30, 1978, of cardiac arrest resulting from anaesthesia. She was there to undergo surgery to correct crossed eyes. (She was only cross eyed in the right eye, which turned inward toward the nose.) She was still owned by Julius Von Uhl at the time. Tony was sent on breeding loan to the Cincinnati Zoo in 1976, to be bred to Rewati from the US National Zoo. However, Tony and Rewati did not breed, so he was bred to Mohini's orange daughter Kesari instead, resulting in a litter of four white and one orange cub June 27, 1976, the same day that eight-year-old Sheba had her white cubs in Baltimore, Maryland. It is an astounding coincidence that both tigresses gave birth to white cubs on exactly the same day. On that one day America's white tiger population nearly doubled from 8 to 14. Kesari's 1976 litter represented a mixture of the two unrelated strains.

All of the white cubs from Kesari's 1976 litter by Tony were cross-eyed, as were Rewati, Bagheera, and Frosty. The Cincinnati Zoo retained a brother and sister pair from the litter, named Bhim and Sumita, and their orange sister Kamala. Two white males returned to the Hawthorn Circus with Tony as John Cuneo's share from the breeding loan. John Cuneo also asked the Bristol Zoo to trade some white tigers, to diversify the gene pool, but the Bristol Zoo declined, perhaps not wishing to exchange pure-Bengals for mongrels. Tony, Bagheera, and Frosty lived for years with a troop of Hawthorn Circus tigers stationed at Marineland and Game Farm, in Niagara Falls, Ontario, Canada. Because of selective breeding only a few of the oldest white tigers in the Hawthorn Circus today are cross eyed. Bhim and Sumita became the world record parents of white cubs. In 1976 there were 39 white tigers-7 in New Delhi, 7 in Kolkata, one in Guwahati, one in Lucknow, one in Hyderabad, 8 in Bristol, Cincinnati Zoo had 2, Washington had 5, John Cuneo had 5, and Julius Von Uhl had 2. The Maharaja of Rewa retired from the white tiger business in 1976. He later abdicated in favor of his son so that he could run for the family seat in parliament and became an MP. There is a white tiger cub on the shield of the coat of arms of the Maharajas of Rewa.

Over 70 white tigers have been born at the Cincinnati Zoo, which is no longer in the white tiger business. The Cincinnati Zoo sold white tigers for $60,000 each. Siegfried & Roy bought a litter of three white cubs from the Cincinnati Zoo, which were offspring of Bhim and Sumita, for around $125,000. Prior to 1974 the Cincinnati Zoo wanted to acquire a white tiger, but no zoo would sell at any price. By the 1980s the Cincinnati Zoo was the world's leading purveyor of white tigers. It was a cousin of the Maharaja of Rewa, Lt. Col. Fatesinghrao "Jackie" Gaekwad, the Maharaja of Baroda, who was also the Commissioner of Indian Wildlife and an MP, who suggested to Siegfried and Roy that they acquire white tigers from the Cincinnati Zoo and include them in their act. "Jackie" was also the President of the World Wildlife Fund India.  In the mid 1980s Siegfried & Roy owned 10% of the world's white tigers, and they were escorting two big white tiger cubs, with dark stripes, to their new home in Phantasialand in Brühl, Germany, when the white tigers were briefly stolen with their truck in New York City. The driver stopped for coffee. The white tigers made their debut in Germany at a ceremony attended by the United States Ambassador.

The Henry Doorly Zoo in Omaha, Nebraska, bought Tony's parents and orange sister Obie (born in 1975) in 1978, and bred more white tigers. Kesari also went to live at Omaha Zoo, but did not have any more cubs. Some of Tony's white siblings born in Omaha proved to be sterile. Obie was paired with Ranjit from the National Zoo, and their cubs like those of Tony and Kesari, included non inbred white tigers. A white tiger named Chester, who was a son of Ranjit and Obie, born at the Omaha Zoo, fathered the first test tube tigers, and then became the first white tiger in Australia when he was sent to the Taronga Zoo in Sydney. His brother, Panghur Ban, was the National Zoo's last white tiger. A white tiger named Rajiv, a son of Bhim, became the first white tiger in Africa, when he was sent to Pretoria Zoo in exchange for a king cheetah.

In 1983 Rewati was paired with Ika, from Kesari's 1976 litter, at the Columbus Zoo. By this time he was a three legged amputee retired from circus performance, put out to pasture to breed. Ika killed Rewati in the act of mating. Ika was then mated with a white tigress named Taj, who was a grand daughter of his brothers Ranjit and Bhim. Ika was also bred to Taj's orange mother Dolly, a daughter of Bhim and an unrelated orange tigress named Kimanthi, in Columbus. Taj's father, Duke, was a son of Ranjit from an outcross to an unrelated orange tigress. Isson, a white grandson of Kesari and Tony, was also dispatched to Columbus on breeding loan from the Hawthorn Circus, of Grayslake, Illinois, which eventually had 80 white tigers, the largest collection in the world at the time. In 1984 five white tiger cubs were stolen from the Hawthorn Circus in Portland, Oregon, and two died. The tigers were touring with the Ringling Bros. Barnum & Bailey Circus. The culprit was a veterinarian who was sentenced to one year in prison and six months in a halfway house. Cincinnati Zoo director Ed Maruska testified in the case that the five white cubs had a dollar value in excess of $5000.

In 1974 a white cub was born in the Racine Zoological Gardens in Wisconsin, from a father-daughter mating. The father, named Bucky, killed the white cub. The mother, named Bonnie, was later bred with an orange littermate of Tony named "Chequila", who belonged to James Witchey of Ravenna, Ohio, who bought him from Dick Hartman of South Lebanon, Ohio, when he was four or five years of age. Chequila proved to be a white gene carrier and fathered at least one white cub in the Racine Zoo in 1980. It is not known whether Bucky, who came from the Fort Wayne Children's Zoo in Indiana, and his daughter Bonnie, were related to any of the established strains of white tigers, but it is possible that Bucky was another one of the cubs of Kubla and Susie, born in Sioux Falls. By 1987 10% of North American zoo tigers were white.

The Odisha strain
Three white tigers were also born in the Nandankanan Zoo in Bhubaneswar, Odisha, India in 1980. Their parents were an orange father–daughter pair called Deepak and Ganga, who were not related to Mohan or any other captive white tiger – one of their wild-caught ancestors would have carried the recessive white gene, and it showed up when Deepak was mated to his daughter. Deepak's sister also turned out to be a white gene carrier. These white tigers are therefore referred to as the Orissa strain, as opposed to the Rewa strain, of white tigers founded by Mohan.

When the surprise birth of three white cubs occurred there was a white tigress already living at the zoo, named Diana, from New Delhi Zoo. One of the three was later bred to her creating another blend of two unrelated strains of white tigers. This lineage resulted in several white tigers in Nandan Kanan Zoo. Today the Nandankanan Zoo has the largest collection of white tigers in India. The Cincinnati Zoo acquired two female white tigers from the Nandan Kanan Zoo, in the hopes of establishing a line of pure-Bengal white tigers in America, but they never got a male, and did not receive authorization from the Association of Zoos and Aquariums (AZA)'s Species Survival Plan (SSP) to breed them. The Zoo Outreach Organisation used to publish studbooks for white tigers, which were compiled by A.K. Roychoudhury of the Bose Institute in Calcutta, and subsidized by the Humane Society of India. The Columbus Zoo had also hoped to breed pure-Bengal white tigers, but were unable to obtain a white registered Bengal mate for Rewati from India.

There were also surprise births of white tigers in the Asian Circus, in India, to parents not known to have been white gene carriers, or heterozygotes, and not known to have any relationship to any other white tiger strains. There was a female white cub born at Mysore Zoo in 1984, from orange parents, descended from Deepak's sister. The white cub's grandmother Thara came from the Nandankanan Zoo in 1972. Mysore Zoo had a second female white tiger cub from New Delhi Zoo in 1984. On August 29, 1979, a white tigress named Seema was dispatched to Kanpur Zoo to be bred to Badal, a tiger who was a fourth generation descendant of Mohan and Begum. The pair did not breed so it was decided to pair Seema with one of two wild caught, notorious man eaters, either Sheru or Titu, from the Jim Corbett National Park. Seema and Sheru produced a white cub, and for a while it was thought there might be white genes in Corbett's population of tigers, but the cub did not stay white.

There have been other cases of white tiger, white lion, and white panther cubs being born, and then changing to normal color. White tigers which were a mixture of the Rewa and Orissa strains, born at the Nandan Kanan Zoo, were non inbred. A white tiger from out of the Orissa strain found its way to the Western Plains Zoo in Australia. Australia's Dreamworld, on the Gold Coast, wanted to breed this tiger to one of their white tigers from the United States.

See also
 Mainland Asian tiger
 Outbreeding depression

References

Felids and humans
Animals in captivity